MXR Yorkshire was a regional commercial digital radio multiplex in the United Kingdom, which served Yorkshire, Lincolnshire, North Nottinghamshire and North Derbyshire. The multiplex closed in June 2015 after the shareholders Global Radio & Arqiva decided not to renew the licence.

Stations broadcast

History

 On 7 November 2002, the Radio Authority awarded a digital radio licence to MXR Limited for the Yorkshire region. The MXR beat another bid for the licence from The Yorkshire Digital Radio Company.
 Yorkshire Radio started test transmissions on MXR Yorkshire from 26 June 2006 and has replaced jazzfm.com.
 LBC replaced the Digital News Network from 28 July 2006 and LBC started broadcasting on 1 September 2006.
 Capital Disney ceased broadcasting on the multiplex on 29 June 2007, freeing up 128kbit/s of space on the multiplex, filled by UCB UK and UCB Inspirational (64kbit/s each).
 The Arrow stopped broadcasting via this platform as it switched platforms with XFM in 2009.
 Gold replaces LBC from 1 Nov 2012. Global Radio took the decision to remove LBC from the Yorkshire regional digital radio multiplex and replace it with Gold.

Transmitters
MXR Yorkshire is transmitted on frequency block 12A from the following sites:

See also

MXR North East
MXR North West
MXR Severn Estuary
MXR West Midlands

References

Digital audio broadcasting multiplexes